Joshua Chiu Ban It (– 9 November 2016) was  the Bishop of Singapore from 1966 to 1981, and was the first indigenous Bishop of Singapore.

Chiu graduated with a Bachelor of Laws from the University of London in 1941 and was ordained after a period of study at Westcott House, Cambridge in 1943. His first post was as Curate at St Francis Bournville after which he was Priest in charge of St Hilda, Katong. and then Vicar of Selangor.

From 1959 to 1961, Chiu was Home Secretary of the Australian Board of Missions and from then, until his elevation to the episcopate, held a similar post with the World Council of Churches as Secretary of Laymen.

External links 
Portrait

Notes

Alumni of the University of London
1921 births
Anglican bishops of Singapore
2016 deaths
Singaporean Anglicans
Singaporean people of Chinese descent
Singaporean religious leaders
Deans of Singapore
Alumni of Westcott House, Cambridge
Anglican bishops of West Malaysia